Chris Wallin is an Australian geologist and businessman. He is the Managing Director of QCoal Group and Chairman of the QCoal Foundation.

Early life
Chris Wallin grew up in Moorooka, a suburb of Brisbane. His father was born in Eidsvold, Queensland and fought in World War II. He attended Brisbane State High School and was interested in rocks, minerals and soils from a young age. He was awarded a scholarship to attended the University of Queensland and graduated with a Bachelor of Science in Geology.

Career
After graduation from university, he worked as a geologist for the Department of Mines and Energy of the Government of Queensland. Wallin discovered coal deposits throughout Queensland. In 1989 he founded QCoal for the purpose of developing these deposits into operating mines. QCoal mines coal from a number of mines in the Bowen Basin, including the Sonoma mine, Drake mine and Byerwen mine.

Personal life
He lives in The Gap, a suburb of Brisbane. In 2013 he partnered with the Royal Flying Doctor Service to deliver a mobile dental service to provide free dental health care to communities across central and northern Queensland.

Net worth 
In January 2019 Forbes estimated Wallin's net worth as 910 million; while he was listed with a net worth of 1.45 billion on the 2021 Financial Review Rich List.

References

Living people
Scientists from Brisbane
People educated at Brisbane State High School
University of Queensland alumni
Businesspeople from Brisbane
Year of birth missing (living people)
Australian billionaires
Australian geologists